Tomato is a multi-discipline design and film collective, founded in London in 1991 by Steve Baker, Dirk van Dooren, Simon Taylor, John Warwicker and Graham Wood, plus musicians Karl Hyde and Rick Smith of the electronic group Underworld and Colin Vearncombe, the artist also known as Black. They were joined by Jason Kedgley in 1994.

The collective includes a worldwide group of directors, designers, artists, writers, producers and composers, who develop cross-platform projects that are commercial, artistic and research based.

Tomato also regularly lectures on design and has published the books, Process Bareback, and Tycho's Nova.

In addition to its core studio in London, Tomato has a presence in Melbourne and Tokyo. In 2012, Tomato opened its first wholly owned US entity, Tomato Studios, with a main creative/production studio in Los Angeles and field office in New York. In 2014, Tomato signed an agreement with production company Twist Films for exclusive director representation in the US, and co-development of creative projects.  As of 2016, however, the US business is no longer affiliated with Tomato.

Publications
Process: A Tomato Project. London: Thames & Hudson, 1996. .
Bareback: A Tomato Project. London: Laurence King, 1999. .
Tycho's Nova: A Tomato Project. By Graham Wood. Self-published, 2001. .

References

External links 
Tomato UK Website

Graphic design studios
Advertising agencies of the United Kingdom
Transmedia storytelling
Companies based in the City of Westminster
1991 establishments in England
British companies established in 1991
Mass media companies established in 1991
Design companies established in 1991